Vitalijus is a Lithuanian masculine given name.

People bearing the name Vitalijus include:
Vitalijus Karpačiauskas (born 1966), Lithuanian boxer
Vitalijus Kavaliauskas (born 1983), Lithuanian footballer 
Vitalijus Rumiancevas (born 1985), Lithuanian alpine skier 
Vitalijus Satkevičius (born 1961), Lithuanian politician

References

Lithuanian masculine given names